Harold Boyd "Hal" Easterwood (October 14, 1932 - August 13, 2005) was an American football player. Easterwood played college football at the center position for the Mississippi State Bulldogs football team. He was selected by the Football Writers Association of America as the first-team center on its 1954 College Football All-America Team.  He later worked as a high school football coach in Mississippi and was inducted into the Mississippi Sports Hall of Fame in 2005.

References

1932 births
2005 deaths
American football centers
Mississippi State Bulldogs football players
Players of American football from Mississippi
People from Holmes County, Mississippi